Marvin Crenshaw (born February 3, 1952) is a former American football offensive tackle who played college football at the University of Nebraska–Lincoln and attended Woodward High School in Toledo, Ohio, where he was named All-City and All-City Academic in football and basketball. He was drafted by the Pittsburgh Steelers in the sixth round of the 1975 NFL Draft. He was a consensus All-American in 1974. He was also named first-team All-Big Eight in 1974.

References

Living people
1952 births
Players of American football from Ohio
American football offensive tackles
African-American players of American football
Nebraska Cornhuskers football players
All-American college football players
Sportspeople from Toledo, Ohio
21st-century African-American people
20th-century African-American sportspeople